The Persian vole (Microtus irani) is a species of rodent in the family Cricetidae.
It is only found in Iran.

References

Musser, G. G. and M. D. Carleton. 2005. Superfamily Muroidea. pp. 894–1531 in Mammal Species of the World a Taxonomic and Geographic Reference. D. E. Wilson and D. M. Reeder eds. Johns Hopkins University Press, Baltimore.

Microtus
Endemic fauna of Iran
Rodents of Asia
Mammals described in 1921
Taxa named by Oldfield Thomas
Taxonomy articles created by Polbot